Berw may refer to:

 Berwickshire a country in Scotland
 Berw Fault a geological fault in Wales
 Pentre Berw a village on Angelsey